Vinciane Despret is a Belgian philosopher of science, associate professor, at the University of Liège, Belgium.

Biography 

Vinciane Despret first graduated in philosophy. She studied psychology and graduated in 1991. She is most known for having provided a reflexive account on ethologists, observing babblers in the Negev desert and the way they would interpret those birds' complex dance moves.

She is considered to be a foundational thinker in what has now become the field of animal studies. More generally, at the heart of her work lies the question of the relationship between observers and the observed during the conduct of scientific research.

Despret affiliates herself to such critical thinkers in philosophy and anthropology of science as Isabelle Stengers, Donna Haraway and Bruno Latour. She undertakes a critical understanding of how science is fabricated, following scientists doing fieldwork and the way they actively create links and specific relationships to their objects of study.

Main works 

 "The Body We Care for: Figures of Anthropo-zoo-genesis", Body & Society, 2004, 10:2-3, 111-134.
 Our emotional Makeup. Ethnopsychology and Selfhood. New York : Other Press, 2004.
 "Sheep do have Opinions", in B. Latour & P. Weibel (eds), Making Things Public. Atmospheres of Democracy, 2006, Cambridge (MA) : M.I.T. Press, 360-370.
 "Ecology and Ideology : the Case of Ethology", International Problems, vol. XXXIII.63 (3-4) : 45-61.
 "The Becoming of Subjectivity in Animal Worlds", Subjectivity, 2008, 23, 123-129.
 What Would Animals Say If We Asked the Right Questions?, trans. Brett Buchanan, 2016, Minneapolis (MN): University of Minnesota Press.

Co-authored books in French 

 with Isabelle Stengers, Les faiseuses d'histoires. Que font les femmes à la pensée?, Paris, La Découverte (Les empêcheurs de penser en rond), 2011.
 with Jocelyne Porcher, Etre Bête, Arles, Actes sud, 2007.

References 

1959 births
Living people
21st-century Belgian philosophers
Writers from Brussels
Belgian women philosophers
Ethologists
Sociologists of science